Osinachi Nwachukwu (died 8 April 2022) was a Nigerian gospel musician. She achieved popularity through the single "Ekwueme" featuring Prospa Ochimana. Her death was alleged to be as a result of domestic violence. Her husband, Peter Nwachukwu, was arrested in connection with her death.

Early life and Education 
Osinachi Nwachukwu was born on 12 November 1979 into an Igbo Family in Owerri, Nigeria. She attended a private school and proceeded into a private university in Nigeria.

Career 
Osinachi was a highly spirit filled Nigerian Gospel musician, a minister of God, a songwriter with a great voice and a Christian worship producer. Most of her songs were written in Igbo language. Her career reach its peak in 2017 due to her famous single "Ekwueme". She had featured in songs like " Nara Ekele" by Pastor Paul Enenche (Dunamis, Abuja), Ekwueme by Prospa Ochimana and "You no dey use me play" by Emma.

References 

20th-century births
2022 deaths
Domestic violence in Nigeria
21st-century Nigerian women singers